FC Znamya Noginsk is a Russian football team from Noginsk. It has played professionally since 2020, having previously done so in 1949, between 1958 and 1969, as well as between 1994 and 2002. Znamya’s best result was being runner-up in the second-tier Soviet First League in 1959. As of 2022, the club plays in the third-tier FNL 2.

Current squad
As of 22 February 2023, according to the Second League website.

Team name and location history
 1936–1948 FC Krasnoye Znamya Noginsk
 1949–1957 FC Spartak Noginsk
 1958–1961 FC Trud Noginsk
 1962 FC Trud Glukhovo
 1963–1964 FC Trud Noginsk
 1965–1992 FC Znamya Noginsk
 1993–2005 FC Avtomobilist Noginsk
 2006–2008 FC Noginsk
 2008 FC Ekolab-SDYuShOR Elektrogorsk
 2009 FC SDYuShOR Noginsk
 2010 FC Znamya

External links
  Team history at FootballFacts

Association football clubs established in 1911
Football clubs in Russia
Football in Moscow Oblast
1911 establishments in the Russian Empire